Tsunekazu is a masculine Japanese given name.

Possible writings
Tsunekazu can be written using different combinations of kanji characters. Here are some examples:

常一, "usual, one"
常和, "usual, harmony"
常多, "usual, many"
常数, "usual, number"
恒一, "always, one"
恒和, "always, harmony"
恒多, "always, many"
恒数, "always, number"
庸一, "common, one"
庸和, "common, harmony"
庸多, "common, many"
庸数, "common, number"
毎一, "every, one"
毎和, "every, harmony"
毎多, "every, many"
毎数, "every, number"

The name can also be written in hiragana つねかず or katakana ツネカズ.

Notable people with the name
 , Japanese businessman, president of The Pokémon Company.
Tsunekazu Kataoka (片岡 恒一, 1896–1952), Japanese politician.
 , Japanese temple and shrine carpenter.
 , Japanese equestrian.

Japanese masculine given names